Tonica mixogama is a moth in the family Depressariidae. It was described by Edward Meyrick in 1928. It is found on New Britain of Papua New Guinea.

References

Moths described in 1928
Tonica